Argyroeides magon is a moth of the subfamily Arctiinae. It was described by Schaus in 1892. It is found in Santa Catarina, Brazil.

References

Moths described in 1892
Argyroeides
Moths of South America